The Simonini Mini 4 is an Italian aircraft engine, designed and produced by Simonini Racing of San Dalmazio di Serramazzoni for use in ultralight aircraft.

Design and development
The Mini 4 is a single cylinder two-stroke, air-cooled, gasoline engine design, with a poly V belt reduction drive with reduction ratios of 2.56:1 and 2.78:1. It employs capacitor discharge ignition electronic ignition and produces  at 7200 rpm.

Specifications (Mini 4)

See also

References

External links

Air-cooled aircraft piston engines
Simonini aircraft engines
Two-stroke aircraft piston engines